Nihonkai (日本海) may refer to:
 Sea of Japan, the body of water between Japan, Korea and Russia
 Nihonkai (train), an overnight sleeping car train service that runs along the Sea of Japan coastline